Shared Hope International (SHI) is a non-profit, non-governmental, Christian organization that exists to prevent sex trafficking and restore and bring justice to women and children who have been victimized through sex trafficking. SHI is part of a worldwide effort to prevent and eradicate sex trafficking and slavery. The organization operates programs in the United States, India, Nepal, and Jamaica. Shared Hope leads awareness and training, prevention strategies, restorative care, research, and policy initiatives to mobilize a national network of protection for victims.

Shared Hope International was founded in 1998 by former Congresswoman Linda Smith. While still a member of the U.S. Congress, Smith traveled to Falkland Road in Bombay, India, one of the worst brothel districts in the world. Her observations there inspired her to found Shared Hope International.

Shared Hope's early efforts were focused on international sex trafficking. With a grant from the U.S. Department of State, Shared Hope spent three years facilitating meetings between government, law enforcement, and the private sector in six countries to encourage protection, prosecution and prevention. Under another grant from the U.S. Department of State, Office to Monitor and Combat Trafficking in Persons the organization conducted a comparative examination of sex trafficking in four distinct countries, Japan, Jamaica,  Netherlands and the United States. The goal was to determine which factors (race, religion, socioeconomic status of citizens, cultural norms, government structure, etc.) contributed to sex trafficking in a country. The results from this DEMAND. report and documentary, concluded that demand, those individuals willing to purchase sex, are the driving force behind the market and that child sex trafficking is prevalent in America.

Under a grant from the U.S. Department of Justice, Shared Hope conducted further research on child sex trafficking in the U.S.  This report to the Department of Justice in 2009, The National Report on Domestic Minor Sex Trafficking, documented these findings in ten U.S. locations and, along with the DEMAND report,

Following the DEMAND. report and documentary, Shared Hope began researching the scope and response to child sex trafficking in America, known as Domestic Minor Sex Trafficking (DMST). Shared Hope focused its attention on eleven American locations, including cities in Florida, Texas, Louisiana, and New York, examining the access to and delivery of services for child sex trafficking victims. This research resulted in the publication of The National Report on Domestic Minor Sex Trafficking: America's Prostituted Children. 
The report found at least 100,000 minors are commercially sexually exploited every year and the average age a child is first exploited through prostitution is 13, and The National Report on Domestic Minor Sex Trafficking was entered into the Congressional Record as definitive research on this under-investigated issue. This research initiated Shared Hope's expansion of prevention, restoration and justice programs in the United States, while continuing to provide programs and partnership opportunities to local organizations in foreign countries.

Prevention Programs 
SHI hosts trainings around the nation for law enforcement, social service providers and child welfare professionals, judges, prosecutors, and community members to identify warning signs of trafficking and employ intervention techniques to assist child trafficking victims. SHI hosts an annual JuST (Juvenile Sex Trafficking) Conference in Washington, D.C. which gathers over 500 professionals and advocates for two days of advanced training on the issue. The organization also offers training videos and workbooks for law enforcement and social service providers.

Shared Hope has also conducted over a dozen research projects including DEMAND. (trafficking markets), The National Report on Domestic Minor Sex Trafficking (trafficking of U.S. minors), field assessments in 14 locations (regional assessments of the access to and delivery of services for trafficked victims), The National Colloquium Report (evaluation of U.S. shelter and services), the Demanding Justice Benchmark Assessment and Demanding Justice Report (evaluation of criminal justice outcomes for buyers), the Protected Innocence Challenge (annual report on state child sex trafficking laws), Traffic Stop (state agency responses to trafficking), and others.

Shared Hope has organized "Kids are not for Sale" awareness campaigns in Oregon, Las Vegas, Chicago, Washington, D.C., and Virginia to engage community members in anti-trafficking events and initiatives. Shared Hope created the Pathbreaker Award to elevate the visibility of innovative leadership in the anti-trafficking community. Chosen youth sex trafficking prevention resources have been distributed and screened at schools, churches, philanthropic and humanitarian clubs and organizations, among others. In June 2006, Shared Hope International founded The Defenders USA, a coalition of men that are opposed to all forms of commercialized sex. Defenders are committed to ending the demand for sexually explicit material by educating men about the dangers of pornography and refusing to purchase sexual services.

To build momentum in the international movement against trafficking, Linda Smith founded the War Against Trafficking Alliance (WATA) in January 2001. WATA coordinated regional and international efforts necessary to combat sex trafficking and conferences around the world. In February 2003, WATA co-sponsored its first World Summit with the U.S. Department of State which brought together leaders from 114 nations, all demonstrating a sustained commitment to prosecute trafficking and provide assistance to victims. In 2005, WATA was invited to participate, along with UNIFEM, in the first ASEAN conference to address child sex tourism in East and Southeast Asia. Since 2006 Shared Hope International has partnered with Anti-Trafficking Task Forces in ten U.S. cities with funding from the U.S. Department of Justice to identify and provide services to American victims of DMST. Shared Hope partners with Children at Risk, a child's advocacy organization in Houston, to work on eradicating domestic minor sex trafficking in Houston.

Shared Hope also collaborates with Brunner, Sex + Money, ECPAT, The Protection Project, Oprah Winfrey Network, Shield Genie, and TRUST Arizona.

Restoration Programs 
Shared Hope International provides business mentorship, financial support and technical assistance to local organizations around the world to support the development of programs that offer holistic, long-term care to vulnerable and exploited women and children. To inform these partnerships and offer strategic insight on promising practices, Shared Hope convenes key stakeholders, thought leaders and experienced practitioners to drive forward the discussion about shelter and services in America.

Building upon 16 years of experience in developing and providing restorative care worldwide, Shared Hope launched the National Restoration Initiative to serve as a catalyze for the ongoing development of shelter and services for America's trafficked youth. Today, shelter and service options and methods remain largely inconsistent and minimally documented. To help achieve a consistent standard of care and build upon the lessons and good practices of current shelter and service providers, Shared Hope conducts research, hosts national forums and partners with local shelter and service organizations.

Created by Shared Hope, the Women's Investment Network (WIN) provides women the opportunity to engage in hands-on vocational training, leadership development and job skills courses so they can meet the demands of the competitive global market and achieve financial independence. Providing survivors with the skills and means of creating their own economic sustainability helps reduce the risk of re-victimization. Today, the WIN program is active in Nepal, India, Jamaica and the United States. International training programs include cosmetology, jewelry-making, bakeries, print services, tailoring and leather-making. The domestic training program, operating in Washington state, is a nine-month program that focuses on computer and administrative skills.

Terry's House is an independent living home for women aged 18–24 years old. The newly renovated home is located in the Pacific Northwest. Women will receive counseling, life skills courses and access to education and vocational training programs.

Shared Hope International currently supports Villages of Hope in India, Jamaica and Nepal, where women and children victimized by sex trafficking can live without time limits. These restorative shelters have a holistic approach to recovery, including providing healthcare, counseling, and educational and job skills training. Shared Hope also partners with seven U.S. shelter and service providers operating in Florida, Maryland, Minnesota, Missouri, North Carolina, Ohio, and Pennsylvania, which provide services such as street outreach programs, counseling, and restoration homes.

Justice-Oriented Projects 
The Protected Innocence Challenge was developed in 2011 to inspire and equip advocates and bring accountability to states. This comprehensive legal analysis provides an annual Report Card on the sufficiency of state child sex trafficking laws and recommendations for improvement. Under the Challenge, every state receives a Report Card that grades the state on 41 key legislative components that must be addressed in the state's laws in order to effectively respond to the crime of domestic minor sex trafficking. In addition, each state receives a complete analysis of this 41-component review and practical recommendations for improvement. Shared Hope operates a Legislative Action Center  to encourage individuals to advocate for improvements in public justice systems by contacting policy leaders and media outlets about sex trafficking laws in their state.

Shared Hope launched the Demanding Justice Project in 2013 to study the criminal justice outcomes of buyers of sex acts with minors. The report and corresponding website, www.demandingjustice.org, elevate the visibility of those who purchase sex with minors and call for strong enforcement of anti-demand laws.

JuST Response is a project of the National Restoration Initiative and the Protected Innocence Challenge that brings together Shared Hope's research on services for domestic minor sex trafficking victims with its analysis of state statutory protective responses. By merging research on implementation and policy analysis, JuST Response seeks to broaden the research in this emerging area to inform legislative efforts and the implementation of existing responses to child sex trafficking victims.

Shared Hope International supported the Justice for Victims of Trafficking Act of 2013 (H.R. 3530; 113th Congress), a bill that would authorize the appropriation of $25 million annually over the 2015-2019 period for the United States Department of Justice (DOJ) to provide grants to states and other recipients aimed at improving the enforcement of laws against human trafficking and to assist victims of such crimes. Shared Hope International referred to the bill as "crucial legislation" in a letter they wrote for citizens to send to their representatives. In the letter, they argued that the bill "clarifies current law and codifies court decisions that the conduct of buyers who “solicit” and “patronize” commercial sex with a child are committing the crime of sex trafficking. Buyers of sex acts with children fuel the sex trafficking markets; without demand, traffickers will lose their profits and countless children will be spared the horrors of sexual exploitation." The organization also supported the bill for enabling state and local law enforcement to get wiretaps in state court for cases related to sex trafficking and improved on reporting systems.

Shared Hope International supported the Stop Exploitation Through Trafficking Act of 2013 (H.R. 3610; 113th Congress), a bill that would require each state, within three years, to have in effect legislation that: (1) treats a minor who has engaged or attempted to engage in a commercial sex act as a victim of a severe form of trafficking in persons, (2) discourages the charging or prosecution of such an individual for a prostitution or sex trafficking offense, and (3) encourages the diversion of such individual to child protection services. Shared Hope International offered a form letter on their website that citizens could send to their members of Congress. The letter argued that the bill would help victims gain compensation and enable them to participate in the Job Corps training program, as well as it would improve laws to ensure that children are treated as victims and not criminals.

References

International human rights organizations
Non-profit organizations based in Vancouver, Washington
Organizations established in 1998
Organizations that combat human trafficking